Odense Boldklub are a Danish professional association football club based in Odense, Denmark, who currently play in the Danish Superliga.

This list encompasses the major honours won by Odense, records set by the club, their managers and their players.  The player records section includes details of the club's leading goalscorers and those who have made most appearances in first-team competitions. It also records notable achievements by Odense players on the international stage, and the highest transfer fees paid and received by the club. Attendance records at Odense Stadium are also included in the list.

The club have won 3 Danish championships.

All statistics are correct

Honours

Player records

Most appearances
Competitive, professional matches only, appearances as substitute in brackets.

Top goalscorers
Competitive, professional matches only, appearances as substitute in brackets.

Transfers

Record transfer fees received

European statistics

External links

References

Odense Boldklub